Alan Chan Yun Lung (born February 29, 1988) is a male badminton player from New Zealand who specializes in doubles. In 2008 he started representing Hong Kong, then in 2017 he returned to representing New Zealand.

Career
Chan started his junior career at age eight as a New Zealand player. In 1999, when he was eleven, he won the boys' and mixed doubles title at the New Zealand U-14 championships. 

In 2004, he represented his country at the Commonwealth Youth Games in Bendigo, Australia. He was also a member of the New Zealand team at the 2007 Sudirman Cup in Glasgow, Scotland. 

Chan moved to Hong Kong with his parents and, in 2008, he was selected to join the national team. He was the 2012 and 2013 mixed doubles champion at the Hong Kong national championships. He also represented Hong Kong at the 2014 Asian Games.

Achievements

BWF International Series
Mixed Doubles

Men's doubles

References

External links
 
 

New Zealand male badminton players
Hong Kong male badminton players
Living people
1988 births
Badminton players at the 2014 Asian Games
Asian Games competitors for Hong Kong